The Alabama gubernatorial election of 1998 was held on November 3, 1998, to select the governor of Alabama. The election saw incumbent Governor Fob James (R) against Lieutenant Governor Don Siegelman (D). The result saw Don Siegelman win a decisive victory over Fob James. , this was the last time a Democrat was elected governor of Alabama.

Republican primary
The Republican primary took place on June 2 and saw no candidate secure over 50% of the vote, leading to a runoff on June 30. Incumbent Governor Fob James won the runoff to become the Republican nominee.

Candidates
 Winton Blount, businessman, candidate for Governor in 1994 and son of former U.S. Postmaster General Winton M. Blount
 Guy Hunt, former Governor
 Fob James, incumbent Governor
 Mac McAllister, businessman
 Phil Williams Sr., former Director of the Alabama Department of Finance

Results

Democratic primary
The Democratic primary took place on June 2 and saw Lieutenant Governor Don Siegelman easily chosen as the Democratic nominee over Birmingham attorney Lenora Pate and Wayne Sowell.

Candidates
 Lee Lamb
 Lenora Pate, attorney and former Director of the Alabama Department of Industrial Relations
 Don Siegelman, Lieutenant Governor of Alabama

Results

General election results

References

External links
Recent Alabama gubernatorial election results
CNN coverage of election result

See also

1998
Gubernatorial
Alabama